Peskov or Pyeskov (from песок meaning sand) is a Russian masculine surname, its feminine counterpart is Peskova. It may refer to
Dmitry Peskov (born 1967), Russian diplomat
Mikhail Peskov (1834–1864), Russian history and genre painter and lithographer
Nikolay Peskov (born 1990), Russian army veteran
Vasily Peskov (1930–2013), Russian writer, journalist, photographer, traveller and ecologist
Vitaly Peskov (1944–2002), Russian cartoonist and illustrator
Yevhen Pyeskov (born 1981), Ukrainian association football midfielder

See also
Peshkov

Russian-language surnames